The 3 arrondissements of the Aube department are:
 Arrondissement of Bar-sur-Aube, (subprefecture: Bar-sur-Aube) with 108 communes. The population of the arrondissement was 28,759 in 2016.  
 Arrondissement of Nogent-sur-Seine, (subprefecture: Nogent-sur-Seine) with 79 communes. The population of the arrondissement was 54,067 in 2016.  
 Arrondissement of Troyes, (prefecture of the Aube department: Troyes) with 244 communes. The population of the arrondissement was 226,084 in 2016.

History

In 1800 the arrondissements of Troyes, Arcis-sur-Aube, Bar-sur-Aube, Bar-sur-Seine and Nogent-sur-Seine were established. The arrondissements of Arcis-sur-Aube and Bar-sur-Seine were disbanded in 1926. 

The borders of the arrondissements of Aube were modified in January 2018:
 one commune from the arrondissement of Nogent-sur-Seine to the arrondissement of Troyes
 four communes from the arrondissement of Troyes to the arrondissement of Bar-sur-Aube

References

Aube